The Nuremberg Code is a set of ethical research principles for human experimentation created by the court in U.S. v Brandt, one of the Subsequent Nuremberg trials that were held after the Second World War.

Though it was articulated as part of the court's verdict in the trial, the Code would later become significant beyond its original context; in a review written on the 50th anniversary of the Brandt verdict, Jay Katz writes that "a careful reading of the judgment suggests that [the authors] wrote the Code for the practice of human experimentation whenever it is being conducted."

Background
The origin of the Code began in pre–World War II German politics, particularly during the 1930s and 1940s. Starting in the mid-1920s, German physicians, usually proponents of racial hygiene, were accused by the public and the medical society of unethical medical practices. The use of racial hygiene was supported by the German government in order to promote an Aryan race. Racial hygiene extremists merged with National Socialism to promote the use of biology to accomplish their goals of racial purity, a core concept in the Nationalist ideology. Physicians were attracted to the scientific ideology and aided in the establishment of National Socialist Physicians' League in 1929 to "purify the German medical community of 'Jewish Bolshevism'." Criticism was becoming prevalent; Alfons Stauder, member of the Reich Health Office, claimed that the "dubious experiments have no therapeutic purpose", and Fredrich von Muller, physician and the president of the Deutsche Akademie, joined the criticism.

In response to the criticism of unethical human experimentation, the Weimar Republic (Germany's government from 1919 to 1933) issued "Guidelines for New Therapy and Human Experimentation". The guidelines were based on beneficence and non-maleficence, but also stressed legal doctrine of informed consent. The guidelines clearly distinguished the difference between therapeutic and non-therapeutic research. For therapeutic purposes, the guidelines allowed administration without consent only in dire situations, but for non-therapeutic purposes any administration without consent was strictly forbidden. However, the guidelines from Weimar were negated by Adolf Hitler. By 1942, the Nazi party included more than 38,000 German physicians, who helped carry out medical programs such as the Sterilization Law.

After World War II, a series of trials were held to hold members of the Nazi party responsible for a multitude of war crimes. The trials were approved by President Harry Truman on 2 May 1945, and were led by the United States, Great Britain, and the Soviet Union. They began on 20 November 1945, in Nuremberg, Germany, in what became known as the Nuremberg trials. In the trial of USA v. Brandt, which became known as the "Doctors' Trial", German physicians responsible for conducting unethical medical procedures on humans during the war were tried. They focused on physicians who conducted inhumane and unethical human experiments in concentration camps, in addition to those who were involved in over 3.5 million sterilizations of German citizens.

Several of the accused argued that their experiments differed little from those used before the war, and that there was no law that differentiated between legal and illegal experiments. This worried Drs. Andrew Ivy and Leo Alexander, who worked with the prosecution during the trial. In April 1947, Dr. Alexander submitted a memorandum to the United States Counsel for War Crimes outlining six points for legitimate medical research.

An early version of the Code known as the Memorandum, which stated explicit voluntary consent from patients are required for human experimentation, was drafted on 9 August 1947. On 20 August 1947, the judges delivered their verdict against Karl Brandt and 22 others. The verdict reiterated the Memorandum's points and, in response to expert medical advisers for the prosecution, revised the original six points of the Memorandum to ten points. The ten points became known as the Code, which includes such principles as informed consent and absence of coercion; properly formulated scientific experimentation; and beneficence towards experiment participants. It is thought to have been mainly based on the Hippocratic Oath, which was interpreted as endorsing the experimental approach to medicine while protecting the patient.

Authorship 'controversy'
The Code was initially ignored, but gained much greater significance about 20 years after it was written. As a result, there were substantial rival claims for the creation of the Code. Some claimed that Harold Sebring, one of the three U.S. judges who presided over the Doctors' trial, was the author. Leo Alexander, MD and Andrew Ivy, MD, the prosecution's chief medical expert witnesses, were also each identified as authors. In his letter to Maurice Henry Pappworth, an English physician and the author of the 1967 book Human Guinea Pigs, Andrew Ivy claimed sole authorship of the code. Leo Alexander, approximately 30 years after the trial, also claimed sole authorship. However, after careful reading of the transcript of the Doctors' trial, background documents, and the final judgements, it is more accepted that the authorship was shared and the code grew out of the trial itself.

The ten points of the Nuremberg Code

The ten points of the code were given in the section of the judges' verdict entitled "Permissible Medical Experiments":

Importance

The Code has not been officially accepted as law by any nation or as official ethics guidelines by any association. In fact, the Code's reference to Hippocratic duty to the individual patient and the need to provide information was not initially favored by the American Medical Association. Katz observes that the Western world initially dismissed the Nuremberg Code as a "code for barbarians, but unnecessary (or superfluous) for ordinary physicians." Additionally, the final judgment did not specify whether the Code should be applied to cases such as political prisoners, convicted felons, and healthy volunteers. The lack of clarity, the brutality of the unethical medical experiments, and the uncompromising language of the Code created an image that it was designed for singularly egregious transgressions.

However, the Code is considered by some to be the most important document in the history of clinical research ethics, because of its massive influence on global human rights. In the United States, the Code and the related Declaration of Helsinki influenced the drafting of regulations promulgated by the United States Department of Health and Human Services to ensure ethical treatment of human research subjects, known as the Common Rule, which is now codified in Part 46 of Title 45 of the Code of Federal Regulations.  These regulations are enforced by Institutional Review Boards (IRBs). In 1966, the International Covenant on Civil and Political Rights was adopted by the United Nations, and after enough nations had ratified the Covenant, it came into force on 23 March 1976. Article Seven prohibits experiments conducted without the "free consent to medical or scientific experimentation" of the subject. As of September 2019, the Covenant has 173 states parties.

In his 2014 review, Gaw observes that the Code "not only entered the legal landscape, but also became the prototype for all future codes of ethical practice across the globe." The idea of free or informed consent also served as the basis for International Ethical Guidelines for Biomedical Research Involving Human Subjects proposed by the World Health Organization. Another notable symposium review was published by the Medical University of Vienna in 2017: "Medical Ethics in the 70 Years after the Nuremberg Code, 1947 to the Present". President and Rector Markus Muller writes in his introduction that the Code "constitutes one of the most important milestones in the history of medicine, providing for the first time a proper framework for research on human subjects. This milestone was not a voluntary, precautionary measure, but only came into existence in the aftermath of Nazi atrocities. The Nuremberg Code became a cornerstone of clinical research and bioethics."

In 1995, Judge Sandra Beckwith ruled in the case In Re Cincinnati Radiation Litigation (874 F. Supp 1995) that the Nuremberg Code may be applied in criminal and civil litigation in the Federal Courts of the United States.

See also

References

Further reading

Weindling, Paul: Nazi Medicine and the Nuremberg Trials (Palgrave, Basingstoke 2004)
Schmidt, Ulf: Justice at Nuremberg: Leo Alexander and the Nazi Doctors' Trial (Palgrave, Basingstoke 2004)
Schmidt, Ulf: Karl Brandt. The Nazi Doctor: Medicine and Power in the Third Reich (Continuum, London, 2007)

BRITISH MEDICAL JOURNAL No. 7070, Volume 313: page 1448, 7 December 1996.
"The Nuremberg Code" (1947). In: Mitscherlich A, Mielke F. Doctors of Infamy: The Story of the Nazi Medical Crimes. New York: Schuman, 1949: xxiii–xxv.
Carl Elliot's article "Making a Killing" in Mother Jones magazine (September 2010) asks if the Nuremberg Code is a valid legal precedent in Minnesota

External links
 The Nuremberg Code (1947) on the BRITISH MEDICAL JOURNAL
 Nuremberg Code at the United States Holocaust Memorial Museum

The Holocaust
International criminal law
Human subject research
Design of experiments
1947 in law
United States Nuremberg Military Tribunals
Ethics and statistics
1947 in science
Research ethics
code
1940s in Bavaria
1947 in Germany
1947 documents